The 1995 Pittsburgh Panthers football team represented the University of Pittsburgh in the 1995 NCAA Division I-A football season.

Schedule

Roster

Coaching staff

Game summaries

Washington State

Eastern Michigan

Texas

Ohio State

Virginia Tech

Boston College

Temple

Miami (FL)

Rutgers

Syracuse

West Virginia

Team players drafted into the NFL

References

Pittsburgh
Pittsburgh Panthers football seasons
Pittsburgh Panthers football